The following highways are numbered 582:

United States